Benjamin Claude Cecil Tipper (7 July 1896 – 11 July 1970) was an English cricketer who played five first-class matches for Worcestershire in 1919. All were friendlies, as Worcestershire did not re-enter the County Championship until the following year.

Career
Tipper made his debut on 23 June against Gloucestershire, and his 42 in the first innings helped avert a crisis; he had come in with the score on 27/5, but his steadying knock helped the team to 201. He also took 2/49 in Gloucestershire's own first innings (his first victim being Alfred Dipper), but second time around he was out for 3 and he took no more wickets before the game finished in a draw.

Tipper had no notable success in his next three games, although in mid-August (once more against Gloucestershire) he took the final two wickets in the first innings to record his best bowling analysis of 1.2-1-0-2.
He played only one more first-class match, against Warwickshire a week later. Here he made 43, his career best, and 0; his five overs of bowling were unsuccessful.

Notes

References
 
 

1896 births
1970 deaths
English cricketers
Worcestershire cricketers